HD 32034 (or R 62) is one of seven blue hypergiants in the Large Magellanic Cloud and is suspected to be a shell star.  It lies within the loose association of stars designated NGC 1747.

References 

B-type hypergiants
Dorado (constellation)
Large Magellanic Cloud
032034
Durchmusterung objects